Exaugustus Boiοannes, son of the famous Basil Boioannes, was also a catepan of Italy, from 1041 to 1042. He replaced Michael Dokeianos after the latter's disgrace in defeat at Montemaggiore on May 4. Boioannes did not have the levies and reinforcements that Doukeianos had had at his command. He arrived only with a Varangian contingent. Boioannes decided on trying to isolate the Lombard rebels in Melfi by camping near Montepeloso. 

According to William of Apulia, prior to battle Exaugustus made a speech to the troops as follows:

The Normans, however, sortied from Melfi and camped on the Monte Siricolo, near Montepeloso. They captured a convoy of livestock meant for the Greek camp and forced a battle, in which Boioannes was defeated and captured (September 3, 1041). The Normans, as mere mercenaries, turned the captive catepan over to the Lombard leader Atenulf in Benevento. The latter accepted a large payment in return for the catepan's liberation and promptly kept the entire ransom for himself. Boioannes was free, but not in command any longer.

References

Sources
Chalandon, Ferdinand. Histoire de la domination normande en Italie et en Sicile. Paris, 1907.
Norwich, John Julius. The Normans in the South 1016-1130. Longmans: London, 1967.

11th-century deaths
11th-century catepans of Italy
Year of birth unknown
Year of death unknown